Rinorea oraria is a species of plant in the Violaceae family. It is endemic to Venezuela.

References

Endemic flora of Venezuela
oraria
Vulnerable plants
Taxonomy articles created by Polbot
Taxobox binomials not recognized by IUCN